Detonidae is a family of woodlice in the order Isopoda. There are at least 3 genera and more than 30 described species in Detonidae.

Genera
These three genera belong to the family Detonidae:
 Armadilloniscus Uljanin, 1875
 Deto Guérin-Méneville, 1836
 Detonella Lohmander, 1927

References

Further reading

 
 
 

Isopoda
Articles created by Qbugbot
Crustacean families